Margaret Dilloway is a Japanese American author best known for her novels How To Be An American Housewife and The Care And Handling Of Roses With Thorns.

Biography 
Margaret Dilloway was born in San Diego, California to a Japanese mother and American father.   She grew up in San Diego and has lived in Washington, Hawaii, and San Diego, California as an adult. She attended Scripps College in Claremont, California, earning a Studio Art B.A. She has three children.

Career 
How To Be An American Housewife was published by Putnam Books in 2010  and reprinted in paperback in 2011.  It received positive reviews, including four stars from People magazine.

Her second novel, The Care And Handling Of Roses With Thorns was published by Putnam in August 2012.  The book won the American Library Association Reference and User Services Association 2012 award in Women's Fiction.

Her third book Sisters of Heart and Snow was published in 2015 by Penguin, with narratives alternating between current-day Japanese American sisters and 12th century female samurai Tomoe Gozen .

Middle grade fantasy: MOMOTARO: XANDER AND THE LOST ISLAND OF MONSTERS and MOMOTARO: XANDER AND THE DREAM THIEF were published by Disney-Hyperion and then bought by Balzer + Bray, and optioned by Fox Animation for a feature film.

Middle grade contemporary, published by Balzer + Bray (HarperCollins): SUMMER OF A THOUSAND PIES, FIVE THINGS ABOUT AVA ANDREWS, and WHERE THE SKY LIVES.

In 2020, Margaret was the Zion National Park Artist-in-Residence in February, living there for a month right before the quarantine hit. There she wrote WHERE THE SKY LIVES, which takes place in Zion.

Honors and awards
Christopher Award, FIVE THINGS ABOUT AVA ANDREWS, 2021
Children's Literature Council of Southern California Excellence in a Work of Juvenile Fiction, SUMMER OF A THOUSAND PIES, 2020
American Library Association Asian/Pacific American Librarians Honor Award, MOMOTARO: XANDER AND THE LOST ISLAND OF MONSTERS, 2017
American Library Association Literary Tastes Award for Best Women's Fiction, THE CARE AND HANDLING OF ROSES WITH THORNS, 2013
John Gardner Fiction Award Finalist, 2011
Indie NEXT List Pick, 2010

Bibliography 

  
 
  Contributing author.
 
 "The Japanese Untouchables" http://www.huffingtonpost.com/margaret-dilloway/the-japanese-untouchables_b_697585.html
 "My Mother and the American Way" http://www.blogher.com/my-mother-and-american-way-housekeeping.

See also 
List of Asian American writers

References

American chick lit writers
Living people
American writers of Japanese descent
American women novelists
American novelists of Asian descent
Writers from San Diego
Scripps College alumni
Year of birth missing (living people)
American women writers of Asian descent